Carinthiaphyllum is an extinct genus of corals in the family Geyerophyllidae. The species C. elegans is from the  Carboniferous of China.

See also 
 List of prehistoric hexacoral genera
 Carinthia, a Land in Austria

References 

 On the Coral Genus Carinthiaphyllum Heritsch, with a Description of Carinthiaphyllum Carnicum Heritsch from the Carnic Alps. Minato M. and Kato M., Apr 1967, Journal of the Faculty of Science, Hokkaido University. Series 4, Geology and Mineralogy, Volume 13, Issue 4, pages 313-320 (URL)

Prehistoric Hexacorallia genera
Stauriida
Fossil taxa described in 1936
Paleozoic animals of Asia